Evo, in comics, may refer to:

EVO (comics), an Image Comics/Top Cow crossover

See also
Evo (disambiguation)